Hated in the Nation is a compilation album by American punk rock musician GG Allin, released on cassette tape by ROIR. It consists mainly of then-out-of-print recordings by Allin with his early-era backing groups the Jabbers, the Scumfucs, and the Cedar St. Sluts. Hated in the Nation became Allin's first widespread international release. Since it is a compilation intended to both document Allin's early recording career up to that time and to attract new fans to his music, it is the only GG Allin title that has never gone out-of-print; according to his official website, it is also one of the most popular items in Allin's discography.

Album history
The release came about as Allin's notoriety was growing in New York and New England. ROIR Records president Neil Cooper had approached Mykel Board, Maximum RockNRoll columnist and owner of Siedboard World Enterprises, about the possibility of ROIR doing a GG Allin cassette, since Allin had already had friendly dealings with Board, stemming from Allin's contribution to a compilation album Board had compiled in 1981. 

Cooper wanted to do an all-live album with Allin, but by this time, Allin's appearances were already notorious for his stage antics which included attacking audience members, audience members pulling GG offstage and attacking him in retaliation, GG defecating onstage, and throwing his feces at the audience. The decision was made to compile tracks from Allin's back catalog when the live show to be recorded only lasted three songs.

Allin discussed using recordings from the collection he and Peter Yarmouth had assembled when they created Black & Blue Records. The original plan was to use new studio and live recordings that would be done in New York. Entrusted with supervising the project, Board contacted Allin and then arranged a recording session with Shimmy Disc owner and producer Kramer at the latter's Noise New York studio, and a live date at The Cat Club in New York City. A band was then assembled that included Kramer on bass, Steve Dasinger from Board's own band Artless on drums, and J Mascis of Dinosaur Jr on lead guitar. The backing band would later be collectively named on the sleeve note as "The New York Superscum". 

On Monday, October 6th, 1986, according to Board's liner notes for Allin's posthumous studio album Brutality and Bloodshed for All (1993), Allin arrived at the studio carrying a big bottle of Jim Beam whiskey that was only about one-eighth full, and in a rather visibly disheveled condition from not having bathed or cut his hair in quite some time.

The recording session doubled as a rehearsal for the night's performance; at the beginning of one of the new recordings, Allin is heard giving an instruction to the band on how many times to play a particular song's introduction. The session didn't go completely without a hitch, however, as Allin reportedly broke one of the studio microphones by headbutting it and then, in Board's words, "tried to break the studio floor with his head."

After the recording session/rehearsal concluded, Allin, Board, and the band then went to the Cat Club for the evening's performance, which would also be recorded. A few hours before the show, GG met up with Peter Yarmouth and his bodyguard Don Schlock as both came up to NYC for the show, walked around the lower east side and visited David Peel. As Yarmouth was a big fan of Peel in the 70's and wanted to meet him, they went to Peel's apartment, but the meeting ended with Peel and GG arguing. As they left, Allin and Schlock urinated on Peel's apartment door in response. 

Schlock dared GG to defecate on stage, and GG bought some Ex-Lax at a deli while Schlock ordered a tongue sandwich. Schlock, while eating, told GG he would pay him $20 if he took a dump onstage. Yarmouth and Schlock along with GG then proceeded to the club, with none of them knowing this show would be the show that kicked GG's infamous career off. Before the group's set began, Allin reportedly told Board "It should be a good show tonight - I just ate an entire box of Ex-Lax." 

GG was running in place as he waited for the show to start to keep it in. Predictably, the show itself came to a halt when Allin began it by defecating onstage before the set began,  wearing only a jockstrap and dog collar. Two songs into the performance, GG began to toss his feces into the audience and hit a fan in the head with the microphone stand, with the club's owner ordering the bouncers to remove Allin from the club. 

After GG rubbed himself with the feces, most of the bouncers refused to toss him out. As a result of these antics, the set was only 3 songs long: only those songs from the live performance, "Blood For You", "Ass Fuckin' Butt Lickin' Cunt Suckin' Masturbation" and "Eat My Shit", were usable enough for the album. The other cuts with the New York Superscum - new recordings of "Drink Fight And Fuck" and a "new" cut (apparently improvised) entitled "Ten Year Old Fuck" - were done during the recording/rehearsal session.  

This Cat Club show was reported in The Village Voice and it got a lot of mileage for GG as he was in the letters section of that publication for a month or more.  The rest of the underground/punk music press started paying a lot more attention to GG (most of it trashing him, not praising him). Yarmouth later said "I can not think of a show that had more impact on his career".

To further simulate a live performance, Board used stage monologues from a cassette recording of a 1985 performance Allin had done in Dallas, Texas with a local pickup band called The Texas Nazis. 

The full recording would later be released by Black & Blue Records as Boozin' And Pranks along with other Black & Blue recordings Yarmouth agreed Allin could use. Messages from Allin's answering machine also appear on the album, as does a message left by Allin on Board's own machine. [Actually, all the messages were from MY answering machine. The other info is correct.-- Mykel Board]

In 1998, ROIR reissued Hated in the Nation on compact disc, adding a radio commercial for Allin's first album Always Was, Is And Always Shall Be and three other cuts from the same era covered on the original cassette.

Track listing

Original 1987 cassette
The original cassette retitled some of the tracks in order to get the cassette into retail stores easier.

Side one
"Intro" (M. Board)	
"Stimulation"
"I Wanna Fuck Myself" (listed as "Myself")
"Bite It You Scum" (listed as "Bite It")
"You Hate Me & I Hate You"
"GG's Phone Machine"
"Blood For You"
"Hard Candy Cock" (listed as "Hard Candy")
"Eat My Diarrhea" (listed as "Eat My Leftovers")
"Scumfuc Tradition" (listed as "Tradition")

Side two 
"Drink, Fight and Fuck" (listed as "D F & F")
"Needle Up My Cock" (listed as "Needle")
"Sluts in the City"
"Ten Year Old Fuck" (listed as "Ten Year Old")
"Ass Fuckin' Butt Suckin' Cunt Lickin' Masturbation" (listed as "Multiple Forms of Self-Satisfaction")
"Gimme Some Head (listed as "Gimme Some", Allin's collaboration with Wayne Kramer and Dennis Thompson of the MC5)
"Tough Fuckin' Shit" (listed as "T.F.S.")
"Board's Phone Machine"

1998 CD reissue 
 "Intro" (M. Board)	
 "Stimulation"
 "I Wanna Fuck Myself"
 "Bite It You Scum"
 "You Hate Me & I Hate You"
 "GG's Phone Machine"
 "Blood for You"
 "Hard Candy Cock"
 "Eat My Shit"
 "Scumfuck Tradition"
 "Drink, Fight and Fuck"
 "Needle Up My Cock"
 "Sluts in the City"
 "Ten Year Old Fuck"
 "Ass Fuckin' Butt Suckin' Cunt Lickin' Masturbation"
 "Gimme Some Head"
 "Tough Fuckin' Shit"
 "Board's Phone Machine"
 "Radio Ad for GG's 1st Record"
 "Out for Blood"
 "I Wanna Eat You Out"
 "Pissing on Cosloy" (aka "I Wanna Piss on You")

References

External links
 Hated in the Nation on ROIR
Hated in the Nation on Discogs
Hated in the Nation (album steam) on Apple Music

1987 compilation albums
GG Allin albums
ROIR compilation albums